Sternocera chrysis is a species of beetles belonging to the Buprestidae family.

Subspecies
 Sternocera chrysis chrysis (Fabricius, 1775) 
 Sternocera chrysis nitidicollis Laporte & Gory, 1835

Description
The basic color of the elytra is coppery-brown, while pronotum is usually metallic green.

Distribution
This species can be found in India, Iran, Sri Lanka, Pakistan, Beluchistan, Nepal, Burma, Thailand, Laos, Viet-Nam and China.

References

Buprestidae
Beetles described in 1775
Taxa named by Johan Christian Fabricius